"Mission Statement" is a song by American rock band Stone Sour. It was the single preview of their third studio album Audio Secrecy. It was released digitally through iTunes. The band put this single for free download on their website for 72 hours from 10 June to 12 June.

Track listing

References

Stone Sour songs
2010 singles
2010 songs
Roadrunner Records singles
Songs written by Corey Taylor
Songs written by Shawn Economaki
Songs written by Roy Mayorga
Songs written by Josh Rand
Songs written by Jim Root
Song recordings produced by Nick Raskulinecz
American heavy metal songs